Karl Otto von Seemen  (24 March 1838 - 20 September 1910) was a German botanist and horticulturalist. He is noted for his studies of plants in the south of Africa.

Plants studied
According to the International Plant Names Index (IPNI) some 109 plant names were published by Seemen, including species of Castanopsis, Fagus, Pyrola, Quercus and Salix

Selected species
 (Caprifoliaceae) Viburnum (sect. Oreinotinus) seemenii Graebn.
 (Potamogetonaceae) Potamogeton seemenii Asch. & Graebn.
 (Ranunculaceae) Anemonoides × seemenii (Camus) Holub
 (Salicaceae) Salix seemenii B.Fedtsch.

Publications
1903. Salices Japonicæ, &c. (Leipzig, Gebrüder Borntraeger) 83 pp.

References

19th-century German botanists
1838 births
1910 deaths